Hazel is an unincorporated community in Snohomish County, in the U.S. state of Washington.

History
Prior to European settlement, the Stillaguamish had a village site located opposite the site of the old town, on the banks of the north fork of the Stillaguamish River. There were two large winter houses, with around 150-200 people living here.

A post office called Hazel was established in 1903, and remained in operation until 1927. The community was named after the daughter of a first settler.

References

Unincorporated communities in Snohomish County, Washington
Unincorporated communities in Washington (state)